Gerald Massey (29 May 1828 – 29 October 1907) was an English poet and writer on Spiritualism and Ancient Egypt.

Early life
Massey was born near Tring, Hertfordshire in England to poor parents.  When little more than a child, he was made to work hard in a silk factory, which he afterward deserted for the equally laborious occupation of straw plaiting. These early years were rendered gloomy by much distress and deprivation, against which the young man strove with increasing spirit and virility, educating himself in his spare time, and gradually cultivating his innate taste for literary work. He was attracted by the movement known as Christian socialism, into which he threw himself with whole-hearted vigour, and so became associated with Frederick Denison Maurice and Charles Kingsley.

Later life

From about 1870 onwards, Massey became increasingly interested in Egyptology and the similarities that exist between ancient Egyptian mythology and the Gospel stories. He studied the extensive Egyptian records housed in the Assyrian and Egyptology section of the British Museum in London where he worked closely with the curator, Dr. Samuel Birch, and other leading Egyptologists of his day, even learning hieroglyphics at the time the Temple of Horus at Edfu was first being excavated.

Writing career

Massey's first public appearance as a writer was in connection with a journal called the Spirit of Freedom, of which he became editor, and he was only twenty-two when he published his first volume of poems, Voices of Freedom and Lyrics of Love (1850). These he followed in rapid succession with The Ballad of Babe Christabel (1854), War Waits (1855), Havelock's March (1860), and A Tale of Eternity (1869).

In 1889, Massey published a two-volume collection of his poems called My Lyrical Life. He also published works dealing with Spiritualism, the study of Shakespeare's sonnets (1872 and 1890), and theological speculation. It is generally understood that he was the original of George Eliot's Felix Holt.

Massey's poetry has a certain rough and vigorous element of sincerity and strength which easily accounts for its popularity at the time of its production. He treated the theme of Sir Richard Grenville before Tennyson thought of using it, with much force and vitality. Indeed, Tennyson's own praise of Massey's work is still its best eulogy, for the Laureate found in him a poet of fine lyrical impulse, and of a rich half-Oriental imagination. The inspiration of his poetry is a combination of his vast knowledge based on travels, research and experiences; he was a patriotic humanist to the core. His poem "The Merry, Merry May" was set to music in 1894 by the composer Cyril Rootham and then in a popular song by composer Christabel Baxendale.

Massey was a believer in spiritual evolution; he opined that Darwin's theory of evolution was incomplete without spiritualism:The theory contains only one half the explanation of man's origins and needs spiritualism to carry it through and complete it. For while this ascent on the physical side has been progressing through myriads of ages, the Divine descent has also been going on – man being spiritually an incarnation from the Divine as well as a human development from the animal creation. The cause of the development is spiritual. Mr. Darwin's theory does not in the least militate against ours – we think it necessitates it; he simply does not deal with our side of the subject. He can not go lower than the dust of the earth for the matter of life; and for us, the main interest of our origin must lie in the spiritual domain.

In regard to Ancient Egypt, Massey first published The Book of the Beginnings, followed by The Natural Genesis.  His most important work is Ancient Egypt: The Light of the World, published shortly before his death.

Like Godfrey Higgins a half-century earlier, Massey believed that Western religions had Egyptian roots. Massey wrote,The human mind has long suffered an eclipse and been darkened and dwarfed in the shadow of ideas the real meaning of which has been lost to moderns. Myths and allegories whose significance was once unfolded in the Mysteries have been adopted in ignorance and reissued as real truths directly and divinely vouchsafed to humanity for the first and only time! The early religions had their myths interpreted. We have ours misinterpreted. And a great deal of what has been imposed on us as God’s own true and sole revelation to us is a mass of inverted myths.

One of the more important aspects of Massey's writings were his assertions that there were parallels between Jesus and the Egyptian god Horus, primarily contained in the book The Natural Genesis first published in 1883. Massey, for example, argued in the book his belief that: both Horus and Jesus were born of virgins on 25 December, raised men from the dead (Massey speculates that the biblical Lazarus, raised from the dead by Jesus, has a parallel in El-Asar-Us, a title of Osiris), died by crucifixion and were resurrected three days later. These assertions have influenced various later writers such as Alvin Boyd Kuhn, Tom Harpur, Yosef Ben-Jochannan, and Dorothy M. Murdock. Christian ignorance notwithstanding, the Gnostic Jesus is the Egyptian Horus who was continued by the various sects of gnostics under both the names of Horus and of Jesus. In the gnostic iconography of the Roman Catacombs child-Horus reappears as the mummy-babe who wears the solar disc. The royal Horus is represented in the cloak of royalty, and the phallic emblem found there witnesses to Jesus being Horus of the resurrection.

Criticism
Christian theologian W. Ward Gasque, a PhD from Harvard and Manchester University, sent emails to twenty Egyptologists that he considered leaders of the field – including Kenneth Kitchen of the University of Liverpool and Ron Leprohon of the University of Toronto – in Canada, the United States, Britain, Australia, Germany and Austria to verify academic support for some of these assertions. His primary targets were Tom Harpur, Alvin Boyd Kuhn and the Christ myth theory, and only indirectly Massey. Ten out of twenty responded, but most were not named. According to Gasque, Massey's work, which draws comparisons between the Judeo-Christian religion and the Egyptian religion, is not considered significant in the field of modern Egyptology and is not mentioned in the Oxford Encyclopedia of Ancient Egypt or similar reference works of modern Egyptology. Gasque reports that those who responded were unanimous in dismissing the proposed etymologies for Jesus and Christ, and one unspecified Egyptologist referred to Alvin Boyd Kuhn's comparison as "fringe nonsense." However, Harpur's response to Gasque quotes leading contemporary Egyptologist Erik Hornung that there are parallels between Christianity and ancient Egypt, as do the writings of biblical expert Thomas L. Thompson.

Theologian Stanley E. Porter has pointed out that Massey's analogies include a number of errors. For example, Massey stated that 25 December as the date of birth of Jesus was selected based on the birth of Horus, but the New Testament does not include any reference to the date or season of the birth of Jesus. The earliest known source recognizing 25 December as the date of birth of Jesus is by Hippolytus of Rome, written around the beginning of the 3rd century, based on the assumption that the conception of Jesus took place at the Spring equinox. Hippolytus placed the equinox on 25 March and then added 9 months to get 25 December, thus establishing the date for festivals. The Roman Chronography of 354 then included an early reference to the celebration of a Nativity feast in December, as of the fourth century. Porter states that Massey's serious historical errors often render his works nonsensical. For example, Massey states that the biblical references to Herod the Great were based on the myth of "Herrut" the evil hydra serpent, while the existence of Herod the Great can be well established without reliance on Christian sources.

See also

 Christ myth theory
 Tom Harpur
 Alvin Boyd Kuhn
 The Pagan Christ

References

External links

Ancient Egypt, Light of the World, 12 books on Egypt.
Works by Gerald Massey, edited by Jon Lange.
Africa Within, many of Massey's articles and poems relating to Egypt.
 
 

1828 births
1907 deaths
Chartists
Christ myth theory proponents
Critics of religions
English male poets
English socialists
English spiritualists
Pseudohistorians